The Best Smooth Jazz... Ever! vol. 3 is a compilation album released by EMI in 2006.

Track listing

CD 1
Nat King Cole – "L–O–V–E"
Fred Astaire – "Cheek To Cheek"
Vikki Carr – "Can't Take My Eyes Off You"
Kay Starr – "Crazy"
Ronnie Hilton – "Magic Moments"
Julie London – "Love Letters"
Dinah Shore – "I've Got You Under My Skin"
Helen Reddy – "And I Love You So"
Dick Haymes – "The More I See You"
Helen Shapiro – "Little Miss Lonely"
Dakota Staton – "Dedicated To You"
Alma Cogan – "When I Fall In Love"
Peggy Lee – "The Folks Who Live On The Hill"
Dean Martin – "Kiss"
Stanley Turrentine – "What The World Needs Now Is Love"

CD 2
Louis Prima – "When You’re Smiling (The Whole World Smiles With You)"/"The Sheik Of Araby"
Shirley Bassey – "Kiss Me, Honey Honey, Kiss Me"
Peggy Lee – "Somethin' Stupid"
Alma Cogan – "Dreamboat"
Ruthie Henshall – "All That Jazz"
Gordon Macrae – "You're The Cream In My Coffee"
Bobby Darin – "A Nightingale Sang In Berkeley Square"
Judy Garland – "Zing! Went The Strings Of My Heart"
Lex Baxter – "Poor People Of Paris"
Dinah Washington – "You're Nobody 'Til Somebody Loves You"
Tina Turner – "Night Time Is The Right Time"
The Ron Goodwin Orchestra – "I Say A Little Prayer"
Nancy Wilson – "And I Love Him"
Nat King Cole – "On The Street Where You Live"
Kay Starr – "Baby Won't You Please Come Home"
Vikki Carr – "You Don't Have To Say You Love Me"
Matt Monro – "I Love You Because"

CD 3
Dean Martin – "Memories Are Made Of This"
Julie London – "Diamonds Are A Girl's Best Friend"
Peggy Lee – "A Taste Of Honey"
Louis Prima – "Just A Gigolo"
Sarah Vaughan – "Ev'ry Time We Say Goodbye"
Nancy Wilson – "The Very Thought of You"
Dinah Shore – "It Had to Be You"
Nat King Cole – "Mona Lisa"
Mel Tormé – "Careless Hands"
Danny Williams – "Portrait of My Love"
Ella Fitzgerald – "It's Only Love"
Stanley Turrentine – "Little Girl Blue"
Keri Noble – "Falling"
Joss Stone – "For The Love of You"
Soyka – "Somebody"

CD 4
Blue Café – "Kontrabas"
Flabby – "Miss You All The Time (Parole Parole)"
Gabin – "The Thousand and One Nights"
Keri Noble – "Look at Me"
Lee Morgan – "I'll Wind"
Julie London – "I Got It Bad (And That Ain't Good)"
Nancy Wilson – "Wives And Lovers"
Nat King Cole – "Tenderly"
Keely Smith – "Someone To Watch Over Me"
Earth Kitt – "Moon River"
Dianne Reeves – "Smile"
Peggy Lee – "Boy From Ipanema"
Kanał Audytywny – "Radiowa piosenka o niczym"
Vic Damone – "Tonight"
Matt Monro – "On Days Like These (Italian Job Theme)"
Irma Thomas – "Time Is On My Side"

Charts

References
  

Smooth Jazz
Smooth jazz compilation albums
2006 compilation albums